Alexandru Cătălin Neagu (born 26 January 1993) is a Romanian professional footballer who currently plays as a midfielder for CSM Slatina.

Neagu started playing professional football for FC Argeș Pitești; from there he was transferred to Real Murcia, in Segunda División.

Neagu started his career in Liga I (Romania) playing two years for Pandurii Târgu Jiu, where he was loaned to different teams before finally joining CFR Cluj on 27 July 2016.

Honours
CSM Slatina
Liga III: 2021–22

References

External links
 
 

1993 births
Living people
Sportspeople from Pitești
Romanian footballers
Association football midfielders
FC Argeș Pitești players
Real Murcia players
Liga I players
Liga II players
CS Pandurii Târgu Jiu players
FC UTA Arad players
SCM Râmnicu Vâlcea players
LPS HD Clinceni players
CFR Cluj players
ASA 2013 Târgu Mureș players
CS Mioveni players
FC Metaloglobus București players
FC Ripensia Timișoara players
Liga III players
CSM Slatina footballers
Romanian expatriate footballers
Romanian expatriate sportspeople in Spain
Expatriate footballers in Spain